World Day Against the Death Penalty (10 October) is a day to advocate for the abolition of the death penalty and to raise awareness of the conditions and the circumstances which affect prisoners with death sentences. The day was first organised by the World Coalition Against the Death Penalty in 2003. It has since taken place annually on 10 October.

The day is supported by numerous NGOs and world governments, including Amnesty International, the European Union and the United Nations. On 26 September 2007, the Council of Europe also declared 10 October to be the European Day Against the Death Penalty.

It focuses on a particular theme, to highlight certain issues surrounding capital punishment. In 2018, the theme was the living conditions on death row. Previous themes include poverty, terrorism, drug crimes and mental health.

See also
 Capital punishment
 Capital punishment debate
 Cities for Life Day
 World Coalition Against the Death Penalty
 International Commission Against the Death Penalty
 United Nations moratorium on the death penalty

References

External links
World Day Against the Death Penalty
European Day against Death Penalty

Capital punishment
Opposition to the death penalty